Diogal Sakho (born 1970, Ngor, Dakar) is a Senegalese singer and musician.

He was born in a small Lebou community. He is a self-taught guitarist and composed his first songs when he was a child. He was discovered by Loy Ehrlich in 1996. He currently lives in France.

Discography 
Samba alla,  (Celluloïd/Mélodie), 2002
Liir, (Celluloïd/Mélodie), 2004
Li lan la, (D. Sakho/Wasia, 2008

References

External links
www.afrik.com

21st-century Senegalese male singers